Juan José Nogués Portalatín (28 March 1909 – 2 July 1998), also known as Joan Josep Nogués, was a Spanish Aragonese footballer and manager. During the 1930s and 1940s, he played as a goalkeeper for FC Barcelona, the Catalan XI and Spain. He later became manager of several La Liga clubs including CF Barcelona,  Gimnàstic de Tarragona and RCD Español.

Playing career
He was keeper from Zaragoza C.D. (known as Tomates -named Tomatoes because of their all red uniform-, team that merged with Iberia to create R. Zaragoza in 1932). Nogués made his La Liga debut for FC Barcelona on 12 December 1930 in a 1–1 draw with Racing de Santander. During his playing career with the club he helped them win the Campionat de Catalunya five times. Between 1932 and 1941 he also played 10 games for the Catalan XI. On 14 February 1934 he played against Spain at Les Corts. Spain, who were preparing for the 1934 World Cup, won 2–0. Nogués was subsequently included in the Spain squad for the World Cup. He played his only game for Spain in a quarter-final replay against Italy on 1 June 1934, replacing Ricardo Zamora who had been injured in the first game. After the World Cup was over, Brazil, with a team that included Leônidas, played the Catalan XI twice before going home and Nogués played in both games. On 17 June the Catalan XI beat Brazil 2–1 at Les Corts and then on 24 June they held them to a 2–2 draw in Girona.

Coaching career
After retiring as a player, Nogués took over as manager at FC Barcelona during the 1941–42 season. The season had seen Barça, with a team that included Domènec Balmanya, struggle in La Liga, narrowly avoiding being relegated after winning a play-off against Real Murcia. Despite this however the club managed to win the Copa del Generalísimo, beating Atlético Bilbao 4–3 after extra time. During the 1942–43 season Nogués led Barça to third in La Liga and to the Copa del Generalísimo semi-final. In the semi-final they were drawn against Real Madrid and after winning the first-leg 3–0 at Les Corts they were controversially beaten 11–1 at the Charmartín. It has been alleged that the Barça players were pressured into losing the game by supporters of Francoist Spain.

Nogués subsequently coached Gimnàstic de Tarragona during their seasons in La Liga during the 1940s. In 1947 Gimnàstic also reached the Copa del Generalísimo semi-final but lost to RCD Español. In the quarter finals they had beaten FC Barcelona. They finished their debut La Liga season, 1947–48, in seventh place with the highlight coming on 11 January 1948 when they beat Real Madrid 3–1 at the Bernabéu. As a result, they became the first team to beat Real at the  Bernabéu and are still the only team to win there on their first visit.

Honours
Player

FC Barcelona

Campionat de Catalunya: 5
1930, 1931, 1932, 1935, 1936

Manager

CF Barcelona

Copa del Generalísimo: 1
1942

References

External links
 Spain stats
La Liga player stats
 Nogués at www.fcbarcelona.com
 La Liga manager stats
Profile at www.fcbarcelonaonline.com

1909 births
1998 deaths
People from Campo de Borja
Sportspeople from the Province of Zaragoza
Spanish footballers
Footballers from Aragon
Spain international footballers
1934 FIFA World Cup players
La Liga players
FC Barcelona players
Real Zaragoza players
Spanish football managers
La Liga managers
FC Barcelona managers
Gimnàstic de Tarragona managers
RCD Espanyol managers
UE Lleida managers
Sporting de Gijón managers
Association football goalkeepers
Catalonia international guest footballers